Luko Biskup (born 14 June 1981) is a Croatian retired footballer who last played for Kukësi in the Albanian Superliga as a defensive midfielder.

Club career
Biskup, born in Dubrovnik, SFR Yugoslavia, started his career in 2001 with AC Mestre. A year later, he switched to NK Zagreb, and made 40 league appearances, before switching to Hrvatski Dragovoljac in 2005. After making 15 league appearances for Hrvatski Dragovoljac, he switched to Inter Zaprešić in 2006, making 23 league appearances in a two-year spell at the club. In 2008, he joined NK Vinogradar, making 41 league appearances, before switching to Skënderbeu Korçë in 2010. Having made 43 league appearances for Skënderbeu Korçë, he joined current club KS Kukësi in 2012.

Honours 
Skënderbeu Korçë
 Albanian Superliga (2): 2010-11 2011-12

References

1981 births
Living people
Sportspeople from Dubrovnik
Association football midfielders
Croatian footballers
NK Zagreb players
NK Hrvatski Dragovoljac players
NK Inter Zaprešić players
NK Vinogradar players
KF Skënderbeu Korçë players
FK Kukësi players
Croatian Football League players
Kategoria Superiore players
Croatian expatriate footballers
Expatriate footballers in Albania
Croatian expatriate sportspeople in Albania